The 988 Suicide & Crisis Lifeline (formerly known as the National Suicide Prevention Lifeline) is a United States-based suicide prevention network of over 200+ crisis centers that provides 24/7 service via a toll-free hotline with the number 9-8-8. It is available to anyone in suicidal crisis or emotional distress. The caller is routed to their nearest crisis center to receive immediate counseling and local mental health referrals. The Lifeline supports people who call for themselves or someone they care about.

History

United States 
The National Suicide Prevention Lifeline grant is one component of the National Suicide Prevention Initiative (NSPI), a multi-project effort to reduce suicide, led by the Substance Abuse and Mental Health Services Administration's (SAMHSA) Center for Mental Health Services.

In July 2004, SAMHSA released a notice of funding availability (NOFA) as part of its National Suicide Prevention Initiative (NSPI). In keeping with SAMHSA's duty to advance the goals of the National Strategy for Suicide Prevention, the NOFA called for proposals from nonprofit organizations for using a toll-free number and website to expand, enhance and sustain a network of certified crisis centers providing suicide prevention and intervention services to those in need.

In September 2004, the Mental Health Association of New York City (MHA-NYC) was selected to administer the federally funded network of crisis centers named the National Suicide Prevention Lifeline.

On January 1, 2005, the National Suicide Prevention Lifeline was launched by the Substance Abuse and Mental Health Services Administration, a division of the Department of Health and Human Services, and Vibrant Emotional Health.

In April 2017, for his third album Everybody, American rapper Logic released a song featuring Canadian singer Alessia Cara and American singer Khalid titled "1-800-273-8255", the number used for the National Suicide Prevention Lifeline. On the day of the song's release, the lifeline received one of its highest daily call volumes; Lifeline's Facebook page also received triple the usual number of visitors, and its website reported "a 17% increase in users in May 2017 over the previous month." The song was made to bring awareness to the hotline and to the problems associated with suicide. Calls to the hotline increased by 50% the night the song was featured on the 2017 MTV Video Music Awards. Many of the callers to several crisis centers have mentioned Logic's song, and a third of those callers were struggling with suicidal thoughts. The song was performed at the 60th Annual Grammy Awards as a tribute to Linkin Park vocalist Chester Bennington, who had committed suicide in the previous year.

The National Suicide Hotline Improvement Act of 2018 required the Federal Communications Commission and other agencies to consider a three-digit number for the hotline. On August 15, 2019, FCC staff recommended that the Commission designate the number 988 for the hotline. On December 12, 2019, the Commission approved a proposed rule starting the process for public commenting and final rulemaking. The rule was adopted on July 16, 2020, in final form in a 5–0 vote by the FCC. The rule required telecommunication carriers to implement the telephone number 988 to route calls to the existing service number by July 16, 2022. This provided sufficient time to expand staff and training to handle the anticipated call volume. Areas that had seven-digit dialing and numbers that began with 988 were required to either change to ten-digit dialing or retire their 988 prefix; where ten-digit dialing was elected (which was the case in 82 area code regions; only one area retired the prefix), it was required to be implemented by October 24, 2021.

On October 17, 2020, the National Suicide Hotline Designation Act (S.2661) was signed into law by President Donald Trump to support the implementation of the hotline. Disability advocates, calling for equity, petitioned the FCC to implement text-to-988 service for deaf, hard-of-hearing and speech-disabled people. The following month, on November 20, 2020, T-Mobile became the first wireless carrier to implement the 9-8-8 number for voice calls.

Massachusetts officials asked the FCC to change the basis of routing calls from area code of the cell phone number, to physical location.

The National Suicide Prevention Lifeline was renamed to the 988 Suicide & Crisis Lifeline on July 15, 2022. 9-8-8 was officially implemented as the toll-free nationwide telephone number for the hotline on July 16. According to call centers in Massachusetts, the easier-to-remember number and surrounding publicity increased the number of calls by about 30%.

The new number is also used for the Veterans Crisis Line (VCL). An increase of calls was reported to the VCL after the rollout of 988.

Canada 
In December 2020, shortly after the U.S. FCC finalized its plans for 9-8-8, Canada's House of Commons unanimously passed a non-binding motion, put forward by Conservative MP Todd Doherty, calling on the federal government to establish 9-8-8 as the national suicide prevention hotline. In June 2021, the Canadian Radio-television and Telecommunications Commission (CRTC) recommended using a three-digit number, most likely 9-8-8, for mental health and suicide prevention in Canada, and began consultations on the matter, noting that the last four area codes with seven-digit dialing and numbers that begin with 988—506, 709, 807 and 867—would likely have to convert to ten-digit dialing.

The launch of the U.S. service in July 2022 caused increased attention to the then-still-pending Canadian plans; a Health Canada statement that month indicated it expected a CRTC decision on the matter before the end of 2022. As an interim measure, in June the CRTC had directed mobile service providers to provide automated messaging to those calling or texting 9-8-8 on or after July 16, 2022, redirecting them to Canada's existing suicide prevention services: 1 (833) 456-4566 for voice calls, or text 741741 (adults), 686868 (youth), or 1 (855) 957-5353 (Quebec residents).

On August 31, 2022, the CRTC announced it had finalized its decision to make 9-8-8 the national three-digit code for mental health crisis and suicide prevention services, with a scheduled implementation date of November 30, 2023. In order to facilitate this implementation, area codes 709, 807, and 867 (Yellowknife area only) will be required to convert to ten-digit dialing by no later than May 31, 2023 (area code 506 was already scheduled to convert to ten-digit dialing by April 2023).

Referrals from search engines 
Google, Bing, Yahoo and Ask.com and most social media services return the telephone number and website of the lifeline as the first result for searches related to suicide, such as "how to tie a noose" or "I want to die."

Veterans hotline

In June 2007, the Department of Veterans Affairs (VA) partnered with SAMHSA and the National Suicide Prevention Lifeline to provide a hotline to help veterans in emotional crisis. Callers who are U.S. military veterans have the option of being routed to the Veterans Crisis Line by pressing 1. This service caters to VA-specific mental health needs, and helps connect vets to the VA Healthcare system. In addition to the hotline, the veterans hotline also offers text messaging support through texting to 838255, as well as an online chat service for those who want to use the hotline. The hotline also serves the needs of active duty service members, their families, and veterans' caregivers.

Criticism
Criticism of the 988 hotline has garnered social media and press attention. Concerns centered on the role of emergency and police response with respect to involuntary commitment to treatment facilities and incurrence of medical bills. The hotline operator reported that before the adoption of 988, it dispatched emergency services for about 2% of calls. Its policy is to do so only if the caller does not cooperate with making a safety plan and seems likely to act on a plan of suicide.

See also
 Crisis hotline
 List of suicide crisis lines
 Crisis Text Line
 The Kristin Brooks Hope Center
 Samaritans (charity)
 The Trevor Project
 Trans Lifeline

References

External links 
 

Suicide prevention
Mental health organizations in New York (state)
Crisis hotlines
Three-digit telephone numbers
Telecommunications-related introductions in 2005